Butler is a former commuter railroad train station in the borough of Butler, Morris County, New Jersey. Serving passenger and freight trains of the New York, Susquehanna and Western Railway, Butler served as the western terminus of service beginning in 1941, when passenger service was cut from Stroudsburg, Pennsylvania. Trains from Butler operated to Pavonia Terminal in Jersey City until December 12, 1958 and then Susquehanna Transfer in North Bergen until the discontinuation of service on June 30, 1966. Butler station consisted of a single low-level side platform with the wooden frame station. The next station east was Bloomingdale.

Railroad service through Butler began on May 1, 1872 with the opening of the New Jersey Midland Railroad from Pompton Township to Middletown, New York. However, the station at the time was known as West Bloomingdale. The station depot, built in Stick–Eastlake architecture in 1888, currently serves as the Butler Museum, a local nonprofit historical entity. The National Register of Historic Places added Butler station to its listings on January 24, 2002 for its transportation significance.

Butler Museum

The station is used as the Butler Museum.  Operated by the Butler Historical Society, the museum's collections focus on the borough's social, industrial and cultural history.

See also
NYSW (passenger 1939–1966) map
Operating Passenger Railroad Stations Thematic Resource (New Jersey)
National Register of Historic Places listings in Morris County, New Jersey
List of museums in New Jersey

Bibliography

References

External links
 Butler Museum

Butler, New Jersey
Museums in Morris County, New Jersey
History museums in New Jersey
Railway stations on the National Register of Historic Places in New Jersey
Former New York, Susquehanna and Western Railway stations
Former railway stations in New Jersey
National Register of Historic Places in Morris County, New Jersey
New Jersey Register of Historic Places
Railway stations in Morris County, New Jersey
Repurposed railway stations in the United States
Railway stations in the United States opened in 1872
1872 establishments in New Jersey